Virginie Dechenaud (born 7 January 1986) is a French beauty pageant titleholder who represented Rhône-Alpes and placed first runner-up to Miss France 2010.

Miss France
At the age of 5, she dreamed of becoming Miss France. When she turned 22, she participated in Miss Dauphiné 2008 and placed first runner-up, then Miss Rhône-Alpes 2008, becoming fourth runner-up. The next year, she participated in Miss Rhône-Alpes 2009 where she finally won the title and gained the right to participate in Miss France 2010, placing first runner-up to eventual winner, Malika Ménard.

Miss World
Dechenaud was selected by the Miss France organization to represent her country in Miss World 2010 placed top 25, held on 30 October 2010 in Sanya, China.

References

External links

|Clémence Marie Oleksy

|Elise Charbonnier

French beauty pageant winners
Miss World 2010 delegates
Living people
1986 births